Thalasso may refer to

 Thalasso (film)
 Arthur Thalasso (1883–1954), American actor

See also 
 
 Thalassa (disambiguation)